The R708 road is a regional road in County Waterford, Ireland. It travels from Waterford city centre to Waterford Airport and then to the R685.

References

Regional roads in the Republic of Ireland
Roads in County Waterford